GRB 080913 was a gamma-ray burst (GRB) observed on September 13, 2008. The Swift Gamma-Ray Burst satellite made the detection, with follow-up and additional observations from ground-based observatories and instruments, including the Gamma-Ray Burst Optical/Near-Infrared Detector (GROND) and the Very Large Telescope. At 12.8 billion light-years and redshift of 6.7, the burst was the most distant GRB observed until GRB 090423 on April 23, 2009. This stellar explosion occurred around 825 million years after the Big Bang.

References

External links
 IAUC
 A Brief History of High-Energy (X-ray & Gamma-Ray) Astronomy

Eridanus (constellation)
080913
20080913
September 2008 events